Lost tribe(s) may refer to:

 Uncontacted peoples, indigenous peoples without a sustained connection to the world community
 Ten Lost Tribes, the Lost Tribes of Israel

TV and film
 The Lost Tribes (TV series), a 2007 Australian reality series
 The Lost Tribe, a 1977 six-part BBC Scotland television drama serial by Jack Ronder, starring Bill Paterson & Miriam Margolyes, about the arrival of a Lithuanian Jew in Scotland. First broadcast on BBC2 in 1980.
 "The Lost Tribe" (The Goodies), an episode of The Goodies
 "The Lost Tribe" (Stargate Atlantis), an episode of Stargate Atlantis
 The Lost Tribe (1949 film), a 1949 film in the Jungle Jim series
 The Lost Tribe (1985 film), a 1985 New Zealand horror film
 The Lost Tribe (2010 film), a 2010 remake of the 2009 horror film The Forgotten Ones

Music
 Lost Tribe, an English electronic music duo
 Lost Tribe, a 1990s jazz-rock ensemble featuring David Binney, David Gilmore, Adam Rogers, Fima Ephron, and Ben Perowsky
 The Lost Tribes (album), by A Tribe Called Quest, 2006
 Lost Tribes, an album by The Zawinul Syndicate, 1992
 "Lost Tribes", a song by Gruff Rhys from American Interior, 2014

Books
 The Lost Tribe, a 1983 Choose Your Own Adventure book
 The Lost Tribe, a 1978 book by Jack Ronder published by W.H. Allen.